Infernal Connection is the fifth studio album by Polish thrash metal band Acid Drinkers. It was released in December 1994 in Poland through Mega Czad. The album was recorded from 8 September to 3 October 1994 at Modern Sound Studio in Gdynia. The cover art was created by Tomek Molka and Lica and fotos by Kazik Staszewski and Jacek Gulczyński.

Infernal Connection is considered to be one of the most important albums in Polish rock history.

Track listing

Bonus tracks

Personnel 
 Tomasz "Titus" Pukacki – vocals, bass
 Robert "Litza" Friedrich – guitar, backing vocals, lead vocal on track 4, 6
 Dariusz "Popcorn" Popowicz – guitar
 Maciej "Ślimak" Starosta – drums, backing vocals
Music and lyrics – Acid Drinkers (except "Consument": Kazik Staszewski)
Engineered – Adam Toczko, Tomasz Bonarowski
Mixed – Adam Toczko
Mastering – Grzegorz Piwkowski
Kazik Staszewski (Kult) – vocal on track 11
Grzegorz Skawiński – guitar solo on track 11
Tomasz Lipnicki (Illusion) – vocal on track 9
Tomasz Bonarowski – drums on track 5

Release history

References 

1994 albums
Acid Drinkers albums